Lukáš Tesák (born 8 March 1985) is a Slovak former professional international footballer who played as a left back or left midfielder.

Throughout his career, he has also played for Dubnica, Žilina, Rimavská Sobota, Senica and Tatran Prešov in Slovakia, Ukrainian club Zorya Luhansk, Russian clubs Torpedo Moscow and Arsenal Tula, as well as Belarusian Gomel.

Career

Club career
In February 2016, Tesák signed a two-year contract, with the option of an additional year, with Kazakhstan Premier League side Kairat. In July of the same year, Tesák left FC Kairat, re-signing for Arsenal Tula a few days later. On 28 February 2017, FC Arsenal Tula removed him from their Russian Premier League roster.

Later career
In August 2020, he signed with an amateur club Sitno Banská Štiavnica.

Coaching career
After retiring at the end of 2019, it was confirmed in January 2020, that Tesák would continue at Pohronie as a fitness coach. He had resigned from this position in January 2021 to pursue a civilian career.

References

1985 births
Living people
Sportspeople from Žiar nad Hronom
Association football defenders
Slovak footballers
Slovak expatriate footballers
Slovakia under-21 international footballers
Slovakia international footballers
FK Dubnica players
MŠK Žilina players
MŠK Rimavská Sobota players
FK Senica players
1. FC Tatran Prešov players
FC Zorya Luhansk players
FC Torpedo Moscow players
FC Arsenal Tula players
FC Kairat players
FC Gomel players
FK Pohronie players
FK Sitno Banská Štiavnica players
Slovak Super Liga players
2. Liga (Slovakia) players
5. Liga players
Ukrainian Premier League players
Russian Premier League players
Kazakhstan Premier League players
Belarusian Premier League players
Slovak expatriate sportspeople in Ukraine
Slovak expatriate sportspeople in Russia
Slovak expatriate sportspeople in Belarus
Slovak expatriate sportspeople in Kazakhstan
Expatriate footballers in Ukraine
Expatriate footballers in Russia
Expatriate footballers in Belarus
Expatriate footballers in Kazakhstan